Orbeasca is a commune in Teleorman County, Muntenia, Romania. It is composed of three villages: Lăceni, Orbeasca de Jos (the commune center) and Orbeasca de Sus.

References

Communes in Teleorman County
Localities in Muntenia